Archie Finn Collins (born 31 August 1999) is an English professional footballer who plays for  club Exeter City as a midfielder.

Early and personal life
Collins was born in Taunton, and grew up in Bridgwater.

Career
Collins began his career with Exeter City, turning professional in April 2017.

He joined Weston-super-Mare on loan in August 2017, making 8 league appearances, scoring 1 goal. He joined Dorchester Town on loan in December 2017, which was extended in January 2018, and again in February 2018. For Dorchester he scored 2 goals in 14 league appearances.

He made his debut for Exeter City on 28 November 2017, in the Football League Cup.

Playing style
Collins has been described by Exeter City as a "versatile player who can play up front, just behind the striker, wide right, wide left or in central midfield".

Career statistics

Honours
Exeter City
League Two runner-up: 2021–22

References

1999 births
Living people
English footballers
Exeter City F.C. players
Weston-super-Mare A.F.C. players
Association football midfielders
Association football forwards
English Football League players
Sportspeople from Taunton